The Florida Seafood Festival is an annual two-day public event held in Apalachicola, Florida on the first weekend of November. The event is held in Battery Park, and around 25,000 people attend the festival each year. It is the oldest seafood festival in the state.

History 
In 1963, eight members of the Apalachicola Chamber of Commerce gathered to figure out a way to draw more visitors to the town. The idea of a seafood event was brought up, drawing inspiration from a seafood festival, "Harbor Days" which had been held in Apalachichola in 1915. The Florida Seafood Festival was established in 1964. 

The 2010 Florida Seafood Festival Oyster Shucking Champion Mike Martin won the 2010 National Oyster Shucking Championship. In 2012 an estimated 30,000 people attended the event. The festival celebrated its 50th anniversary in 2013.

There was no Florida Seafood Festival in 2020 due to the COVID-19 pandemic. The event returned in 2021.

In 2022 Hurricane Ian caused the carnival ride provider to cancel.

Description 
Each year the festival features a parade (which has been held on the same route since its 1964 inception), carnival, blue crab races, oyster eating and shucking contests. The festival also offers a  road race, a country music concert, arts and craft booths, and plenty of fresh local seafood. The local seafood is prepared by local non-profit groups. 

On the Friday night of the festival, the King Restyo Ball is held to crown the king and queen of the festival.

Awards 
In 2016 the festival was named as one of "America's 15 Best Small-Town Festivals" by Fodor's Travel Guide. That same year, it was named one of "8 Itinerary-Inspiring Seafood Festivals" by Leisure Group Travel.

See also
Florida food festivals

References

External links 
 Official website

Food and drink festivals in the United States
Festivals in Florida
Seafood festivals
Tourist attractions in Franklin County, Florida
Apalachicola, Florida
1963 establishments in Florida
Festivals established in 1963